Crown Prince Maui (born 912), born Gim Il was the last Silla Crown Prince as the son of its last ruler, King Gyeongsun.

The name Maui means "hemp dress", and comes from the fact that he spent his whole life wearing clothes made of hemp linen. His father was killed in the civil war by a lone warrior. After hearing the news, the prince fled to the southern mountains in Jeolla. He was also the creator and the originator of the Nakan (낙안) Kim clan, which branched out from the Gyeongju Kim Clan. After fleeing to Jeolla, he became a Buddhist monk. There are currently 130 Nakan Kim families in Seoul.

In popular culture

TV series & dramas
Portrayed Lee Byung-wook in the 2000–2002 KBS1 TV series Taejo Wang Geon.
Portrayed by Ahn Chi-yong in the 2009 KBS TV series Empress Cheonchu.

Novel
Portrayed in a Historical novel Crown Prince Maui, written by Lee Kwang-soo and was serialized in the Dong-a Ilbo from May 1926 to January 1927. It was published in January 1928 as a book in the Bakmunseogwan (博文書館). The story tells the life of Maui as a young man on Mount Kumgang, after his father, Gyeongsun of Silla, tried to surrender to Taejo of Goryeo.

References

Silla people
Korean princes
10th-century Korean people
Goryeo Buddhists
Year of birth unknown
Year of death unknown
Heirs apparent who never acceded